Chomesqal (also Romanized as Chomes̄qāl and Chams̄aqāl; also known as Chūmes̄qāl) is a village in Kasma Rural District, in the Central District of Sowme'eh Sara County, Gilan Province, Iran. At the 2006 census, its population was 539, in 162 families.

References 

Populated places in Sowme'eh Sara County